RER Vaud is an S-Bahn network in the canton of Vaud in Switzerland. It is centered on Lausanne and began operating in December 2004.

History 
With the December 2022 timetable change the RER Vaud network was substantially reorganized:

Lines 
 the network consists of the following lines:

 :  –  (– )
 : Grandson – Lausanne (– Cully)
 :  – Lausanne –  (– )
 :  / Vallorbe – Lausanne – Aigle (– St-Maurice)
 :  – Lausanne – 
 : Allaman – Lausanne – Palézieux (– )
 :  – , called the Vine Train
 : Palézieux –  (– )
 : Lausanne – 

All lines except the S7 and S8 serve Lausanne, which serves as the main hub of the network.

References

External links
 

Vaud
RER
2004 establishments in Switzerland